Álvaro Grant MacDonald (born 3 February 1938) is a Costa Rican former football player and manager.

Club career
Grant played for Saprissa and Guadalupe at youth and junior level but made his senior debut for Herediano in 1956 and remained with the club until his retirement in July 1973. He totalled 298 league games for the Rojiamarillos and 49 cup games.

International career
Grant was capped by Costa Rica, playing 46 games and scoring 1 goal. He represented his country in 13 FIFA World Cup qualification matches. He also played at the inaugural 1963 CONCACAF Championship. Grant was named by both Radio Monumental and Al Dia newspaper in their squad of the best players of Costa Rica in the 20th century.

Managerial career
After retiring, Grant managed Alajuelense, Herediano and the Costa Rica national football team as well as Puntarenas and Limonense. In October 1998 he took the reins at Goicoechea.

Personal life
Grant was born to Alia Grant, who died when he was young, and had five brothers. He is married to Marla Vega Alfaro  but Álvaro and Marlene Saborío are the parents of Costa Rica international forward Álvaro Saborío.

References

External links
 

1938 births
Living people
Footballers from San José, Costa Rica
Association football defenders
Costa Rican footballers
Costa Rica international footballers
C.S. Herediano footballers
Costa Rican football managers
C.S. Herediano managers
L.D. Alajuelense managers
Costa Rica national football team managers
CONCACAF Championship-winning players